The Press & Sun-Bulletin is a daily newspaper serving the area around Binghamton, New York.    It was formed by the 1985 merger of The Evening Press (which was known as The Binghamton Press prior to 1960) and The Sun-Bulletin.  It is owned by  Gannett, who purchased The Binghamton Press in 1943 and The Sun-Bulletin in 1971.

References

External links

Press & Sun-Bulletin

Daily newspapers published in New York (state)
Gannett publications
Mass media in Binghamton, New York
Companies based in Binghamton, New York
1904 establishments in New York (state)